Ann-Sophie Dürmeyer (born 1 September 1990), better known as simply Ann Sophie, is a German singer and songwriter. She represented Germany in the Eurovision Song Contest 2015 with the song "Black Smoke". Her latest single "Phantom Pain" was released in November 2020.

Life and career

1990: Early life and career
Ann Sophie was born on 1 September 1990 in London, England to German parents. At a young age, she and her family moved back to Germany where they settled in Hamburg, whilst she attended Rydal Penrhos in Colwyn Bay, North Wales, as a boarding student. At age four, she studied ballet. In 2010, she took her abitur and moved to New York City to attend the Lee Strasberg Theatre and Film Institute. In 2012, she released her debut single "Get Over Yourself" which was followed by her first album Time Extended. Ann Sophie also set foot in the musical theatre industry and was recently known for her role as Alex Owens in the musical Flashdance as well as Indigo in the Cirque du Soleil musical Paramour.

2012: Time Extended 
Time Extended was an album made by Sophie which was released on iTunes in 2012. The album features songs that re-appeared in Silver into Gold; these songs included "Have You Ever", "Get Over Yourself" and "Silver into Gold".

2015–present: Eurovision Song Contest and Silver Into Gold

In 2015, Ann Sophie was revealed as one of the ten undiscovered German artists competing for the wildcard spot in Unser Song für Österreich. She performed the song "Jump the Gun" and was selected as the wildcard winner after receiving 24.1% of the vote. She competed in Unser Song für Österreich with the songs "Jump the Gun" and "Black Smoke". The latter of the two advanced to the final round of voting where it placed as the runner-up behind Andreas Kümmert and his song "Heart of Stone". However, Kümmert later declined the opportunity to represent Germany in the Eurovision Song Contest, and Ann Sophie was awarded with the chance to compete and represent her country in the contest to which she accepted. Sophie received very favourable reviews from critics over "Black Smoke". She has released her debut studio album Silver into Gold on 24 April 2015, the album features "Black Smoke" this was the lead single for the album and charted successfully in Germany and Austria with chart numbers being within The Top 30 in Germany and Top 60 in Austria. "Black Smoke" was released on 2 March 2015 as a stand-alone single. The album also features "Jump The Gun" which Sophie performed at the Semi-final for the Eurovision Song Contest 2015, "Silver into Gold" was released on iTunes 24 April 2015.    In the final of the Eurovision Song Contest on 23 May 2015, Ann Sophie scored zero points after the voting, becoming the first German act to do under the modern voting system in place since 1975. Sophie was presented in last place despite another country also getting Zero Points because Sophie performed after the other Nul Point scorer.

Discography

Albums

Extended plays

Singles

References

Living people
1990 births
Musicians from Hamburg
Singers from London
English people of German descent
German expatriates in the United Kingdom
English-language singers from Germany
Eurovision Song Contest entrants for Germany
Eurovision Song Contest entrants of 2015
German women pop singers
21st-century German women singers
Polydor Records artists
Island Records artists